Luka Bogavac (born 20 September 2003) is a Montenegrin professional basketball player for Mega Basket of the ABA League and the Basketball League of Serbia.

Early life and career 
Bogavac grew up with the SIG Strasbourg youth system where his father Nebojša Bogavac was an assistant coach. He joined the Mega Basket youth system in May 2021. At the 2020–21 Euroleague Basketball Next Generation Tournament, he averaged 14.7 points, 5.3 rebounds, and 2 assists per game.

Professional career 
On 23 September 2021, Bogavac officially signed his first professional contract with Mega Basket. Also, he joined OKK Beograd on a two-way contract for the 2021–22 KLS season. Bogavac made his senior debut in the ABA League for Mega Basket on 26 September 2021 in a 101–68 win over SC Derby, making 6 points and a rebound in under 5 minutes of playing time.

National team career 
Bogavac was a member of the Montenegro U16 national team that participated at the 2019 FIBA U16 European Championship Division B in Podgorica, Montenegro. Over eight tournament games, he averaged 9.3 points, 1.9 rebounds, and one assist per game.

In July 2022, Bogavac was a member of the Montenegro under-20 team that won a bronze medal at the FIBA U20 European Championship in Podgorica, Montenegro. Over seven tournament games, he averaged 3.7 points, 2.7 rebounds, and 2.9 assists per game.

References

External links 
 Profile at euroleague.net
 Profile at realgm.com
 Profile at eurobasket.com
 Profile at aba-liga.com

2003 births
Living people
ABA League players
Basketball League of Serbia players
KK Mega Basket players
OKK Beograd players
Montenegrin expatriate basketball people in France
Montenegrin expatriate basketball people in Serbia
Montenegrin men's basketball players
People from Mojkovac
Point guards
Shooting guards